Dr. Irvine Clifton Gardner (1889–1972) was an American physicist.

In 1921, he joined the National Bureau of Standards, and in 1950, he became chief of the Division of Optics and Meteorology. He was the president of the Optical Society of America in 1958.

He was noted for his work on optics and the field of spectroscopy. In his career, he published a number of papers on the subject of optics.

Awards and honors
In 1954, he was awarded the Frederic Ives Medal by the Optical Society of America. In 1955, he was awarded a fellowship of the Society of Imaging Science and Technology. The Gardner Inlet and the crater Gardner on the Moon are named after him.

Bibliography
 "An optical system for reading the angular deflection of a mirror", Journal of the Optical Society of America, vol. 12, 1926.
 "The Optical Requirements of Airplane Mapping", Bureau of Standards Journal of Research, Vol. 8, 1932.
 "Observing an Eclipse in Asiatic Russia", National Geographic, February, 1937.
 "Validity of the Cosine-Fourth-Power law of Illumination", Journal of Research of the National Bureau of Standards, Vol. 39, September 1947.
 "Research and Development in Applied Optics and Optical Glass at the National Bureau of Standards; a Review and Bibliography", Washington Government Printing Office, 1949.

1889 births
1972 deaths
20th-century American physicists